Hobak-juk or pumpkin porridge is a variety of Korean porridge, or juk, made with pumpkin and glutinous rice flour. It is a smooth and naturally sweet porridge that is traditionally served to recovering patients or the elderly.

Preparation 
It is boiled, peeled, deseeded and mashed. Mashed pumpkin can be strained to obtain a smoother texture. It is then mixed with glutinous rice flour slurry and boiled, during which parboiled red beans or black beans may be added. Another common addition is saealsim (literally "bird's egg", named as such due to its resemblance to small bird's eggs, possibly quail eggs), the small rice cake balls made of glutinous rice flour kneaded with hot water. Finally, salt and optionally sugar is added, to taste.

See also 
 Patjuk
 Pumpkin soup
 List of porridges
 List of squash and pumpkin dishes

References 

Juk
Squash and pumpkin dishes